The Aston Martin Vantage GT4 is an updated version of the Aston Martin V8 Vantage N24, debuting in late 2008. Its primary alteration is the introduction of the new 4.7-litre V8 that also debuted in the production V8 Vantage. This replaces the 4.3-litre V8 in the V8 Vantage N24.

Development

The Aston Martin Vantage GT4 is the evolution of the successful Aston Martin V8 Vantage N24 car. It has an enlarged 4.7-litre engine and uprated suspension, allowing for increased camber and castor angles. The brakes have also been uprated with larger diameter front discs and racing pads.

The Vantage GT4 car has been built to FIA GT4 regulations making it eligible to compete in FIA European GT4 and FIA GT4 world endurance races.

2011 GT4

In 2011 Aston Martin upgraded the specification of the Vantage GT4, with better aerodynamics, and increased engine power. Aerodynamic alterations include, a new front splitter for greater front downforce and greater rear downforce through a redesigned floor, new diffuser and a boot flip. The 2011 GT4 also comes with the option of a traction control system and a Bosch ABS system.

References

External links
 Aston Martin Racing

Vantage GT4
Grand tourers
Coupés
Rear-wheel-drive vehicles
2010s cars
Cars introduced in 2005